Zhao Jun (born 5 March 1997) is a Chinese footballer currently playing as a defender for Sichuan Jiuniu.

Career statistics

Club
.

References

1997 births
Living people
Chinese footballers
Association football defenders
China League Two players
China League One players
Sichuan Jiuniu F.C. players